Nivar in Iran may refer to:
 Nivar-e Olya
 Nivar-e Sofla